The 2024 CONCACAF Champions League will be the 16th edition of the CONCACAF Champions League under its current name, and overall the 59th edition of the premier football club competition organized by CONCACAF, the regional governing body of North America, Central America, and the Caribbean. The tournament will be the first under a revised format featuring 27 teams and a five-round knockout phase. The winner of the final will qualify for the 2025 FIFA Club World Cup alongside the winners from 2021 to 2023.

Qualification
A total of 27 teams will qualify for the tournament. Five of the teams will qualify directly for the Round of 16, while the remaining 22 teams will qualify for Round One. In addition to national league and cup competitions, several berths will be determined by international competitions, including the 2023 Leagues Cup and regional championships in the Caribbean and Central America. Unlike in previous years, the three MLS teams based in Canada will be eligible to qualify for the CONCACAF Champions League through slots allocated to MLS, in addition to the slot for the Canadian Championship winners.

Teams
The following 27 teams (from TBD associations) qualify for the tournament. 
North American Zone: 18 teams (from three associations)
Central American Zone: 6 teams (from TBD associations)
Caribbean Zone: 3 teams (from TBD associations)

In the following table, the number of appearances, last appearance, and previous best result count only those in the CONCACAF Champions League era starting from 2008–09 (not counting those in the era of the Champions' Cup from 1962 to 2008).

Notes

Schedule
The schedule of the competition is as follows.

Bracket

Matches

Round One

Round of 16

Quarter-finals

Semi-finals

Final
The championship will be a single-legged match, played on a weekend date, to crown the regional club champions for the 2023–24 season.

References

 
2024
2023–24 in CONCACAF football
Scheduled association football competitions